The discography of British drum and bass production duo Matrix & Futurebound consists of one studio album, one compilation album, six singles and one promotional single.

In 2005, Jamie Quinn collaborated with Liverpool-based producer Brendan Collins to release "Strength 2 Strength". They later released their debut album Universal Truth on 9 April 2007 through Metro Recordings and Viper Recordings, under the alias Matrix & Futurebound. On 10 March 2008, they released "Womb" as a single from the Universal Truth album later followed by a new single "Shanghai Surprise" featuring singer Cat Knight. On 30 May 2011 they released a mix compilation album Worldwide 001.

On 6 May 2012, they released "All I Know" featuring British singer Luke Bingham. The song peaked at number at number 29 on the UK Singles Chart and number 6 on the UK Dance Chart, which marks their first charting single as a duo. Later on in 2012, their second single "Magnetic Eyes" featuring British singer and rapper Baby Blue was released on 30 December 2012. The song peaked at number 24 on the UK Singles Chart and number 5 on the UK Dance Chart. On 29 December 2013, they released "Control" featuring British singer Max Marshall. The song peaked at number 7 on the UK Singles Chart.

Albums

Studio albums

Compilation albums

Singles

As lead artists

Promotional singles

Remixes

References

Discographies of British artists